Kleinwelka (Sorbian: Mały Wjelkow) is a subdivision of the city of Bautzen, Germany. It was first mentioned in 1345. Since the mid-18th century it has been the site of a settlement congregation of the Moravian Church, the Herrnhuter Brüdergemeinde; for many years it was the seat of a boarding school for the children of missionaries from all over the world.

Kleinwelka is a station of the Osterreiten, a regional Easter procession on horseback, from Bautzen to Radibor.

Its main sites of interest are the Saurierpark Kleinwelka and the adjacent Irrgarten (hedge maze).

External links
Homepage Irrgarten Kleinwelka 
Homepage Saurierpark Kleinwelka

Bautzen